SS Ira Nelson Morris was a Liberty ship built in the United States during World War II. She was named after Ira Nelson Morris, the US Minister to Sweden (1914–1923), he also saved 19 year old Ellen Neilson aboard the Scandinavian America Line liner United States in 1921, from being washed overboard.

Construction
Ira Nelson Morris was laid down on 26 October 1944, under a Maritime Commission (MARCOM) contract, MC hull 2387, by J.A. Jones Construction, Brunswick, Georgia; she was sponsored by Constance Lily Morris, widow of the namesake, and launched on 25 November 1944.

History
She was allocated to Seas Shipping Co., Inc., on 8 December 1944. On 27 April 1946, she was laid up in the National Defense Reserve Fleet, in the Hudson River Group. On 12 October 1948, she was laid up in the National Defense Reserve Fleet, in the Suisun Bay Group. On 2 November 1965, she was sold for $48,398.18, to National Metal & Scrap Corp., for scrapping. She was removed from the fleet on 22 November 1965.

References

Bibliography

 
 
 
 
 

 

Liberty ships
Ships built in Brunswick, Georgia
1944 ships
Hudson River Reserve Fleet
Suisun Bay Reserve Fleet